Spexhall is a village  and civil parish in the north-east of the English county of Suffolk. It has few basic services, including a village hall and a parish church, which was originally built as a cell of Rumburgh Priory. The A144 road runs through the parish following the route of the Roman Stone Street. The population in 2011 was 192.

This description of Spexhall was written in the late nineteenth century:

SPEXHALL, a parish in Blything district, Suffolk; 2 miles NNW of Halesworth r. station. Post town, Halesworth. Acres, 1,484. Real property, £2,311. Pop., 181. Houses, 36. The property is divided among a few. The living is a rectory in the diocese of Norwich. Value, £277.* Patron, the Lord Chancellor. The church is old. Charities, £15.

References

External links

 St Peter, Spexhall Suffolk Churches

Villages in Suffolk
Civil parishes in Suffolk